HD 71334 is a Sun-like star 126.7 light years (38.85 parsecs) from the Sun.  HD 150248 is a G-type star and an older solar analog. It is older than the sun at 8.1 billion years, compared to the sun at 4.6 billion years old. At 8.1 billion years old, HD 71334 has passed its stable burning stage. HD 71334 has a lower metallicity that the Sun. HD 71334 is found in the constellations of Puppis. Puppis is one of the 88 modern constellations recognized by the International Astronomical Union. HD 71334 has a brightness of 7.8.

Sun comparison
Chart compares the sun to HD 71334.

See also 
 List of nearest stars

References

71334
G-type main-sequence stars
Solar analogs
Puppis
9263
Durchmusterung objects
041317